Chudniv is a city in Zhytomyr Raion, Zhytomyr Oblast, Ukraine. Prior to 2020, it was the administrative center of the former Chudniv Raion. Population:

History

A significant battle of the Russo-Polish War (1654-1667) was fought near the town in 1660, followed by a treaty between the Polish–Lithuanian Commonwealth and the Cossacks, named after the city. In 1866 Polish Romantic-era novelist Henryk Rzewuski died in Chudniv. The Jewish population was important in the town. During World War II, the Germans occupied the town and kept the Jews imprisoned in a ghetto. In 1941, they were murdered in mass executions perpetrated by an Einsatzgruppen of Germans and Ukrainian policemen.

Notable people from Chudniv
 Alter Chudnover, AKA Yehiel Goyzman (1846–1912), virtuoso klezmer violinist
 Menachem Ribalow - newspaper editor
 Shloimke (Sam) Beckerman - early 20th century klezmer bandleader in New York City

Gallery

References

Cities in Zhytomyr Oblast
Cities of district significance in Ukraine
Kiev Voivodeship
Zhitomirsky Uyezd
Zhytomyr Raion
Holocaust locations in Ukraine